Ealy may refer to the following people:
Given name
Ealy Mays (born 1959), African-American contemporary artist

Middle name
Samuel Ealy Johnson Jr. (1877–1937), American businessman and politician
Samuel Ealy Johnson Sr. (1838–1915), American businessman, politician, cattleman, and soldier

Surname
Adrian Ealy (born 1999), American football player
Biren Ealy (born 1984), American football player
Charles H. Ealy (1884–1947), American politician
Jerrion Ealy (born 2000), American football player
Kony Ealy (born 1991), American football player
Michael Ealy (born 1973), American actor